Kenneth Lauren Burns (born July 29, 1953) is an American filmmaker known for his documentary films and television series, many of which chronicle American history and culture. His work is often produced in association with WETA-TV and/or the National Endowment for the Humanities and distributed by PBS.

His widely known documentary series include The Civil War (1990), Baseball (1994), Jazz (2001), The War (2007), The National Parks: America's Best Idea (2009), Prohibition (2011), The Roosevelts (2014), The Vietnam War (2017), and Country Music (2019). He was also executive producer of both The West (1996), and Cancer: The Emperor of All Maladies (2015). Burns's documentaries have earned two Academy Award nominations (for 1981's Brooklyn Bridge and 1985's The Statue of Liberty) and have won several Emmy Awards, among other honors.

Early life and education
Burns was born on July 29, 1953, in Brooklyn, New York, to Lyla Smith (née Tupper) Burns, a biotechnician, and Robert Kyle Burns, Jr., at the time a graduate student in cultural anthropology at Columbia University in Manhattan. The documentary filmmaker Ric Burns is his younger brother.

Burns's academic family moved frequently. Among places they called home were Saint-Véran, France; Newark, Delaware; and Ann Arbor, Michigan, where his father taught at the University of Michigan. Burns describes his family as hippies.

Burns's mother was found to have breast cancer when he was three, and she died when he was 11, a circumstance that he said helped shape his career; he credited his psychologist father-in-law, Gerald Stechler, with a significant insight: "He told me that my whole work was an attempt to make people long gone come back alive." Well-read as a child, he absorbed the family encyclopedia, preferring history to fiction.

Upon receiving an 8 mm film movie camera for his 17th birthday, he shot a documentary about an Ann Arbor factory. He graduated from Pioneer High School in Ann Arbor in 1971. Turning down reduced tuition at the University of Michigan, he attended Hampshire College in Amherst,  Massachusetts, where students are graded through narrative evaluations rather than letter grades and where students create self-directed academic concentrations instead of choosing a traditional major.

Burns worked in a record store to pay his tuition. Living on as little as $2,500 in two years in Walpole, New Hampshire, Burns studied under photographers Jerome Liebling, Elaine Mayes, and others, describing Liebling as his "principal mentor." He earned his Bachelor of Arts degree in film studies and design in 1975.

Florentine Films
In 1976, Burns, Elaine Mayes, and college classmate Roger Sherman founded a production company called Florentine Films in Walpole, New Hampshire. The company's name was borrowed from Mayes's hometown of Florence, Massachusetts. Another Hampshire College student, Buddy Squires, was invited to succeed Mayes as a founding member one year later. The trio were later joined by a fourth member, Lawrence "Larry" Hott. Hott did not actually matriculate at Hampshire, but worked on films there. Hott had begun his career as an attorney, having attended nearby Western New England Law School.

Each member works independently, but releases content under the shared name of Florentine Films. As such, their individual "subsidiary" companies include Ken Burns Media, Sherman Pictures, and Hott Productions. Burns's oldest child, Sarah, is also an employee of the company as of 2020.

Burns and his team edits on Avid Technology software.

Career

Burns initially worked as a cinematographer for the BBC, Italian television, and others. In 1977, having completed some documentary short films, he began work on adapting David McCullough's book The Great Bridge, about the construction of the Brooklyn Bridge. Developing a signature style of documentary filmmaking in which he "adopted the technique of cutting rapidly from one still picture to another in a fluid, linear fashion [and] then pepped up the visuals with 'first hand' narration gleaned from contemporary writings and recited by top stage and screen actors", Burns made the feature documentary Brooklyn Bridge (1981), which was narrated by David McCullough, and earned an Academy Award nomination for Best Documentary and ran on PBS in the United States.

Following another documentary, The Shakers: Hands to Work, Hearts to God (1984), Burns was Oscar-nominated again for The Statue of Liberty (1985). Burns frequently collaborates with author and historian Geoffrey C. Ward, notably on documentaries such as The Civil War, Jazz, Baseball, and the 10 part TV series The Vietnam War (aired September 2017).

Burns has built a long, successful career directing and producing well-received television documentaries and documentary miniseries. His oeuvre covers diverse subjects including art (Thomas Hart Benton, 1988), mass media (Empire of the Air: The Men Who Made Radio, 1991), sports (Baseball, 1994, updated with 10th Inning, 2010), political history (Thomas Jefferson, 1997), music (Jazz, 2001; Country Music, 2019), literature (Mark Twain, 2001), environmentalism (The National Parks, 2009), and war (the 15-hour World War II documentary The War, 2007; the 11-hour The Civil War, 1990, which All Media Guide says "many consider his 'chef d'oeuvre).

In 2007, Burns made an agreement with PBS to produce work for the network well into the next decade. According to a 2017 piece in The New Yorker, Burns and his company, Florentine Films, have selected topics for documentaries slated for release by 2030. These topics include country music, the Mayo Clinic, Muhammad Ali, Ernest Hemingway, the American Revolution, Lyndon B. Johnson, Barack Obama, Winston Churchill, the American criminal justice system, and African-American history from the Civil War to the Great Migration. On April 5, 2021, Hemingway, a three-episode, six-hour documentary, a recapitulation of Hemingway's life, labors, and loves, debuted on the Public Broadcasting System, co-produced and directed by Burns and Lynn Novick.

Personal life
In 1982, Burns married Amy Stechler. The couple had two daughters, Sarah and Lilly. Their marriage ended in divorce in 1993.

, Burns was residing in Walpole, New Hampshire. He and Julie Deborah Brown, daughter of Leslie Mundjer and the Smith Barney senior vice president Richard Brown and stepdaughter of Ellen Brown, married on October 18, 2003. Julie Deborah Brown founded Room to Grow, a non-profit providing aid to babies in poor families. They have two daughters, Olivia and Willa Burns.

Burns is a descendant of Johannes de Peyster Sr. through Gerardus Clarkson, an American Revolutionary War physician from Philadelphia, and he is a distant relative of Scottish poet Robert Burns. In 2014 Burns appeared in Henry Louis Gates's Finding Your Roots where he discovered that he is a descendant of a slave owner from the Deep South, in addition to having a lineage which traces back to Colonial Americans of Loyalist allegiance during the American Revolution.

Burns is an avid quilt collector. About one-third of the quilts from his personal collection were displayed at The International Quilt Study Center & Museum at the University of Nebraska from January 19 to May 13, 2018. Burns is also an avid fan of the New York Times crossword puzzle, appearing in the documentary Wordplay, and in a 2022 interview he says he completes the puzzle every day.

When asked if he would ever make a film regarding his mother Lyla, Burns responded: "All of my films are about her. I don't think I could do it directly, because of how intensely painful it is."

Politics
Burns is a longtime supporter of the Democratic Party, contributing almost $40,000 in political donations. In 2008, the Democratic National Committee chose Burns to produce the introductory video for Senator Ted Kennedy's August 2008 speech to the Democratic National Convention, a video described by Politico as a "Burns-crafted tribute casting him [Kennedy] as the modern Ulysses bringing his party home to port."

In August 2009, Kennedy died, and Burns produced a short eulogy video at his funeral. In endorsing Barack Obama for the U.S. presidency in December 2007, Burns compared Obama to Abraham Lincoln. He said he had planned to be a regular contributor to Countdown with Keith Olbermann on Current TV. In 2016, he also gave a commencement speech for Stanford University criticizing Donald Trump.

In 2020, Burns endorsed Ed Markey in the Massachusetts Senate Democratic Primary.

In 2022, Burns described the Republican Party as "the party of white supremacy."

Awards and honors

Altogether Burns's work has garnered several awards, including two Oscar nominations, two Grammy Awards and 15 Emmy Awards.

1982 nomination, Academy Award for Documentary Feature: Brooklyn Bridge (1981);
1986 nomination, Academy Award for Documentary Feature: The Statue of Liberty (1985);
1995 Emmy Award for Outstanding Informational Series: Baseball (1994);
2010 Emmy Award for Outstanding Non-fiction Series: The National Parks: America's Best Idea (2009).

The Civil War received more than 40 major film and television awards, including two Emmy Awards, two Grammy Awards (one for Best Traditional Folk Album), the Producer of the Year Award from the Producers Guild of America, a People's Choice Award, a Peabody Award, a duPont-Columbia Award, a D. W. Griffith Award, and the $50,000 Lincoln Prize.

In 1991, Burns received the National Humanities Medal, then called the Charles Frankel Prize in the Humanities.

In 1991, Burns received the Golden Plate Award of the American Academy of Achievement.

In 2004, Burns received the S. Roger Horchow Award for Greatest Public Service by a Private Citizen, an award given out annually by Jefferson Awards.

In 2008 Burns was honored by the Academy of Television Arts & Sciences with a Lifetime Achievement Award.

In 2008 Burns received The Lincoln Forum's Richard Nelson Current Award of Achievement.

In 2010, the National Parks Conservation Association honored him and Dayton Duncan with the Robin W. Winks Award for Enhancing Public Understanding of National Parks. The award recognizes an individual or organization that has effectively communicated the values of the National Park System to the American public.
, there is a Ken Burns Wing at the Jerome Liebling Center for Film, Photography and Video at Hampshire College.

Burns was elected to the American Philosophical Society in 2011.

In 2012, Burns received the Washington University International Humanities Medal. The medal, awarded biennially and accompanied by a cash prize of $25,000, is given to honor a person whose humanistic endeavors in scholarship, journalism, literature, or the arts have made a difference in the world. Past winners include Turkish novelist Orhan Pamuk in 2006, journalist Michael Pollan in 2008, and novelist and nonfiction writer Francine Prose in 2010.

In 2013, Burns received the John Steinbeck Award, an award presented annually by Steinbeck's eldest son, Thomas, in collaboration with the John Steinbeck Family Foundation, San Jose State University, and The National Steinbeck Center.

In May 2015, Burns gave the commencement address at Washington University in St. Louis and received an honorary doctorate of humanities.

Burns was the Grand Marshal for the 2016 Pasadena Tournament of Roses' Rose Parade on New Year's Day in Pasadena, California. The National Endowment for the Humanities selected Burns to deliver the 2016 Jefferson Lecture, the U.S. federal government's highest honor for achievement in the humanities, on the topic of race in America. He was the 2017 recipient of The Nichols-Chancellor's Medal at Vanderbilt University.

In 2019, he received an honorary degree from Brown University.

In 2022 he served as the Commencement speaker at the University of Pennsylvania and received an Honorary Doctor of Arts.

Style
Burns frequently incorporates simple musical leitmotifs or melodies. For example, The Civil War features a distinctive violin melody throughout, "Ashokan Farewell", which was performed for the film by its composer, fiddler Jay Ungar. One critic noted, "One of the most memorable things about The Civil War was its haunting, repeated violin melody, whose thin, yearning notes seemed somehow to sum up all the pathos of that great struggle."

Burns often gives life to still photographs by slowly zooming out subjects of interest and panning from one subject to another. It has long been used in film production where it is known as the "rostrum camera"; notably, it was used decades prior to Burns's career in the Canadian documentary short "City of Gold". An example of the technique as deployed by Burns: in a photograph of a baseball team, he might slowly pan across the faces of the players and come to rest on the player who is the subject of the narration. This technique, possible in many professional and home software applications, is now termed the "Ken Burns effect" in Apple's iPhoto, iMovie, and Final Cut Pro X software applications.
Burns stated in a 2009 interview that he initially declined to have his name associated with the software because of his stance to refuse commercial endorsements. However, Apple chief Steve Jobs negotiated to give Burns Apple equipment, which Burns donated to nonprofit organizations.

As a museum retrospective noted, "His PBS specials [are] strikingly out of step with the visual pyrotechnics and frenetic pacing of most reality-based TV programming, relying instead on techniques that are literally decades old, although Burns reintegrates these constituent elements into a wholly new and highly complex textual arrangement."

In a 2011 interview, Burns stated that he admires and is influenced by filmmaker Errol Morris.

Filmography

Brooklyn Bridge (1981)
The Shakers: Hands to Work, Hearts to God (1984)
The Statue of Liberty (1985)
Huey Long (1985)
The Congress (1988)
Thomas Hart Benton (1988)
The Civil War (1990; 9 episodes)
Empire of the Air: The Men Who Made Radio (1992)
Baseball (1994; 9 episodes – updated with The Tenth Inning in 2010, with Lynn Novick)
The West (1996; 8 episodes)
Thomas Jefferson (1997)
Lewis & Clark: The Journey of the Corps of Discovery (1997)
Frank Lloyd Wright (1998, with Lynn Novick)
Not for Ourselves Alone: The Story of Elizabeth Cady Stanton & Susan B. Anthony (1999)
Jazz (2001; 10 episodes)
Mark Twain (2001)
Horatio's Drive: America's First Road Trip (2003)
Unforgivable Blackness: The Rise and Fall of Jack Johnson (2005; 2 episodes)
The War (2007, with Lynn Novick; 7 episodes)
The National Parks: America's Best Idea (2009; 6 episodes)
Prohibition (2011, with Lynn Novick; 3 episodes)
The Dust Bowl (2012; 4 episodes)
The Central Park Five (2012, with Sarah Burns and David McMahon)
Yosemite: A Gathering of Spirit (2013)
The Address (2014)
The Roosevelts: An Intimate History (2014; 7 episodes)
Jackie Robinson (2016, with Sarah Burns and David McMahon; 2 episodes)
Defying the Nazis: The Sharps' War (2016, with Artemis Joukowsky)
The Vietnam War (2017, with Lynn Novick; 10 episodes)
The Mayo Clinic: Faith – Hope – Science (2018, with Erik Ewers and Christopher Loren Ewers)
Country Music (2019, 8 episodes)
Hemingway (2021, with Lynn Novick; 3 episodes)
Muhammad Ali (2021, with Sarah Burns and David McMahon; 4 episodes)
Benjamin Franklin (2022, 2 episodes)
The U.S. and the Holocaust (2022, 3 episodes, 7 hours total; produced and directed with the assistance of Lynn Novick and Sarah Botstein)

Future releases
The American Buffalo (2023)
Leonardo da Vinci (2024)
The American Revolution (2025)
Henry David Thoreau (2025/2026, as Executive Producer)
LBJ & the Great Society (2027, with Lynn Novick)
From Emancipation to Exodus (working title, also called The History of Reconstruction) (TBA)

Short films
These three short films are collected and distributed together as Seeing, Searching, Being: William Segal.
William Segal (1992)
Vezelay (1996)
In the Marketplace (2000)

As an executive producer
The West (1996) (directed by Stephen Ives)
Cancer: The Emperor of All Maladies (2015) (directed by Barak Goodman)
Walden (short, 2017) (directed by Erik Ewers and Christopher Loren Ewers)
Country Music: Live at the Ryman, a Concert Celebrating the Film by Ken Burns (2019) (directed by Don Carr)
College Behind Bars (2019) (directed by Lynn Novick)
East Lake Meadows: A Public Housing Story (2020) (directed by Sarah Burns and David McMahon)
The Gene: An Intimate History (2020) (directed by Chris Durrance and Jack Youngelson)
Hiding in Plain Sight: Youth Mental Illness (2022) (directed by Erik Ewers and Christopher Loren Ewers)

As an actor
Gettysburg (film; 1993) – Hancock's staff officer
Clifford's Puppy Days – Season 1, episode 24a ("Lights, Camera, Action"; 2005) – self
The Simpsons – Season 24, episode 1 ("Moonshine River"; 2012) – self
The Mindy Project – Season 3, episode 11 ("Christmas"; 2014) – self
Difficult People – Season 2, episode 4 ("Blade Stallion"; 2016) – self
The Simpsons – Season 30, episode 22 ("Woo-Hoo Dunnit?"; 2019) – self

Notes

References

External links

Ken Burns on PBS
Ken Burns bibliography

1953 births
Living people
American cinematographers
American documentary film directors
American documentary film producers
American male screenwriters
American expatriates in France
Artists from Ann Arbor, Michigan
Artists from Brooklyn
Documentary war filmmakers
Primetime Emmy Award winners
Fellows of the American Academy of Arts and Sciences
Film directors from Michigan
Film directors from New Hampshire
Film directors from New York City
Grammy Award winners
Hampshire College alumni
National Humanities Medal recipients
New Hampshire Democrats
People from Walpole, New Hampshire
Lincoln Prize winners